Dario Resta (17 August 1882 – 3 September 1924), nicknamed "Dolly", was an Italian Briton race car driver. He was the winner of the 1916 Indianapolis 500.

Early years
Dario Resta was born in Faenza, Italy but was raised in England from the age of two. He began racing there in 1907 when he took part in the Montagu Cup, the very first race staged at the new Brooklands race track. On October 2, 1913, alternating with Jean Chassagne and Kenelm Lee Guinness in two-hour spells, Resta set up a series of long distance World Records with a Sunbeam Grand Prix car fitted with a single-seater body. After competing in Grand Prix motor racing in Europe, including the 1913 French Grand Prix, he went to the U.S.

Coming to America
In early 1915 he was brought to the United States by Alphonse Kaufman, an America importer of Peugeots, to drive Kaufman's Peugeot EX3. In January he married Mary Wishart, the sister of racer Spencer Wishart who had died the previous year. In February he won the United States Grand Prix, more properly named the United States Grand Prize, at San Francisco followed by a victory in the Vanderbilt Cup. After leading during the final stages of that year's Indianapolis 500, he finished second to Ralph DePalma when his car skidded and he had to make a pit-stop for tyres. Resta then drove his blue Peugeot to victory in the inaugural  race on the board track at the Chicago Speedway on 26 June 1915. The race received eighteen pages of coverage in the 1 July 1915, issue of Motor Age magazine.

The following year, in 1916, en route to winning the United States National Driving Championship, Resta repeated as the winner of the Vanderbilt Cup plus he won the 1916 Indianapolis 500, the Chicago 300, the Minneapolis 150 and the Omaha 150 races.

With World War I raging in Europe and the United States entering the war in 1918, races were reduced to a minimum. During 1918 Resta drove a Peugeot at a race in Sheepshead Bay, Brooklyn, a minor event with only a handful of competitors.

Comeback years
In 1923 Resta returned to racing at the age of 39, making his first appearance in Beverly Hills, California. Next, he made another attempt at Indianapolis but was forced out of the race after . Racing again in Europe, Resta finished 3rd in the Penya Rhin Grand Prix and won the voiturette class at the Spanish Grand Prix. He drove for Sunbeam in the 1924 season with teammates Henry Segrave and Kenelm Lee Guinness.

Death
Dario Resta was killed in England on 3 September 1924 at the age of 42 when his car crashed at Brooklands while trying for a new land speed record. Resta was driving a Sunbeam when a belt on his car broke on the second lap and punctured his tyre sending him out of control. The car crashed through a corrugated iron fence on the Railway Straight and caught fire.

This accident also hospitalized his riding-mechanic, Bill Perkins, causing him to miss the San Sebastian Grand Prix a few weeks later. Perkins was Sunbeam driver Kenelm Lee Guinness's regular mechanic and so was substituted by Tom Barrett. Guinness suffered a serious crash during this race, in which Barrett was killed and this accident led to the end of the practice of carrying riding-mechanics during races.

Indy 500 results

References

External links

Champ Car Stats profile

1880s births
1924 deaths
Champ Car champions
Italian racing drivers
British racing drivers
Italian emigrants to the United Kingdom
Indianapolis 500 drivers
Indianapolis 500 winners
Racing drivers who died while racing
Sunbeam Motor Car Company
English people of Italian descent
Sport deaths in England
British expatriates in the United States
Italian British racing drivers
AAA Championship Car drivers